The Willey House may refer to:
 Malcolm Willey House, a house designed by Frank Lloyd Wright in 1934
 Willey House (New Hampshire), the site of the historic (Samuel) Willey family tragedy